Emir Halilović (born 4 November 1989) is a Bosnian professional footballer who plays as a midfielder for Velež Mostar.

Club career
On 18 June 2022, Halilović signed a two-year contract with Velež Mostar.

International career
Halilović made his international debut for Bosnia and Herzegovina on 16 December 2011, in a 1–0 loss against Poland in a friendly match. It was an unofficial game though, between a Polish team of local league players and a Bosnian Olympic team.

Career statistics

Club

International

Honours
Sarajevo
Bosnian Premier League: 2018–19
Bosnian Cup: 2018–19

References

External links

Emir Halilović at Sofascore
Emir Halilović profile at WhoScored

1989 births
Living people
People from Banovići
Association football wingers
Bosnia and Herzegovina footballers
FK Budućnost Banovići players
NK Zvijezda Gradačac players
FC Hradec Králové players
FC Spartak Trnava players
FC Blau-Weiß Linz players
FK Sarajevo players
Boluspor footballers
Bandırmaspor footballers
Zalaegerszegi TE players
FK Velež Mostar players
Premier League of Bosnia and Herzegovina players
Czech First League players
Czech National Football League players
Slovak Super Liga players
2. Liga (Austria) players
TFF First League players
Nemzeti Bajnokság I players
Bosnia and Herzegovina expatriate footballers
Expatriate footballers in Slovakia
Expatriate footballers in the Czech Republic
Expatriate footballers in Austria
Expatriate footballers in Turkey
Expatriate footballers in Hungary
Bosnia and Herzegovina expatriate sportspeople in Slovakia
Bosnia and Herzegovina expatriate sportspeople in the Czech Republic
Bosnia and Herzegovina expatriate sportspeople in Austria
Bosnia and Herzegovina expatriate sportspeople in Turkey
Bosnia and Herzegovina expatriate sportspeople in Hungary